The 1895 Minor Counties Championship was the first running of the Minor Counties Cricket Championship, and ran from 3 June to 29 August 1895. The inaugural title was shared between three counties—Durham, Norfolk and Worcestershire—as they finished level on three points apiece.

The leading run-scorer was Thomas Pointon, playing for Cheshire, whose score of 110 against Durham was one of only six centuries scored over the course of the season. The leading wicket-taker, Oxfordshire's Peter Rogers, took three ten wicket match hauls.

Table
 One point was awarded for a win, and one point was taken away for each loss.

Notes
  denotes the Champion team(s).
  denotes a team that failed to play the minimum of eight matches. These teams are sometimes omitted from the table altogether.

Averages

References

External links
Minor Counties Championship 1895 at CricketArchive

1895 in English cricket
English cricket seasons in the 19th century
1895